The 1937 Kingston-upon-Thames by-election was held on 1 July 1937.  The by-election was held due to the elevation to the peerage of the incumbent Conservative MP, Frederick Penny.  It was won by the Conservative candidate Percy Royds.

References

Kingston-upon-Thames by-election
Kingston-upon-Thames,1937
Kingston-upon-Thames,1937
Kingston-upon-Thames by-election
Politics of the Royal Borough of Kingston upon Thames
20th century in Surrey
Kingston-upon-Thames by-election